Creontiades signatus, the verde plant bug, is a species of plant bug in the family Miridae. It is found in Central America and North America.

References

Further reading

 

Articles created by Qbugbot
Insects described in 1884
Mirini
Taxa named by William Lucas Distant